Theingyi Market is the largest traditional market in downtown Yangon, Myanmar (Burma). The present-day Theingyi Market complex houses 1,156 wet and dry market shops. The market spans Latha and Pabedan Townships.

The name "Theingyi" literally translates to "great ordination hall" in the Burmese language, as the market was built on the former site of the a pagoda compound in Latha Township. Theingyi Market has its origins in the pre-colonial days, where market stalls were set up around Kyaik Myatthancho Pagoda. In 1854, Indians bought the land from the British to develop the Surati Baryar Bazaar. Fires subsequently broke out, in 1855, 1857, 1868, and 1905. Building A of the complex was built in 1905, and houses 642 shops, while Building B was built in 1938 and houses 505 shops. Buildings C, D, and E were demolished and rebuilt in 1988.

References 

Buildings and structures in Yangon
Shopping malls and markets in Myanmar